The Stolen Necklace is a 1933 British crime film directed by Leslie S. Hiscott and starring Lester Matthews, Joan Marion and Mickey Brantford. It was made as a quota quickie at Teddington Studios.

Cast
 Lester Matthews as Clive Wingate
 Joan Marion as Diana Hunter
 Mickey Brantford as Tom Hunter
 Wallace Lupino as Sailor
 Dennis Wyndham as Sailor
 Charles Farrell as Sailor
 Victor Fairley as Colonel Hunter
 A. Bromley Davenport as Priest

References

Bibliography
 Low, Rachael. Filmmaking in 1930s Britain. George Allen & Unwin, 1985.
 Wood, Linda. British Films, 1927-1939. British Film Institute, 1986.

External links
 

1933 films
1930s English-language films
1933 crime drama films
British crime drama films
Quota quickies
Films shot at Teddington Studios
British black-and-white films
Films directed by Leslie S. Hiscott
1930s British films